H. ensifer  may refer to:
 Heterocarpus ensifer, a deep-water shrimp species
 Hyposmocoma ensifer, a moth species endemic to Hawaii

See also
 Ensifer (disambiguation)